Ronald Maurice "Skip" Schipper (August 7, 1928 –  March 27, 2006) was an American football coach and college athletics administrator.

Career 
Schipper coached high school football  for Northville High School in Northville, Michigan from 1952 to 1959 and at Jackson High School in Jackson, Michigan in 1960. 

Schipper served as the head football coach at Central College in Pella, Iowa from 1961 to 1996, compiling a record of 287–67–3.  Schipper also served as the school's athletic director from 1964 to 1993. During his tenure as head football coach at Central College, he always had a winning season. His teams won 18 Iowa Conference championships, enjoyed ten undefeated regular seasons, and won the 1974 NCAA Division III Football Championship; they were national runners-up in 1984 and 1988.

Schipper's 287 career wins rank third in among NCAA Division III football coaches, behind John Gagliardi's 489 and Larry Kehres's 332.  He retired with an .808 career winning percentage—then the fourth highest in NCAA Division III history.  Schipper was inducted into the College Football Hall of Fame in 2000 and received the Amos Alonzo Stagg Award, presented by the American Football Coaches Association, in 2004.

Personal life 
Schipper was born in Zeeland, Michigan. Schipper died in Holland, Michigan at age 77. He was survived by his wife, Joyce, daughter Sara, and two sons Tim and Thom, grandchildren Nathan, Rachel, Alaina, Elsje and Lukas.

Head coaching record

College

See also
 List of college football coaches with 200 wins
 List of presidents of the American Football Coaches Association

References

External links
 
 

1928 births
2006 deaths
Central Dutch athletic directors
Central Dutch football coaches
High school football coaches in Michigan
College Football Hall of Fame inductees
Hope College alumni
People from Holland, Michigan
People from Pella, Iowa
People from Zeeland, Michigan
American people of Dutch descent
Sportspeople from Michigan